Tomter is a surname. Notable people with the surname include:

Andrine Tomter (born 1995), Norwegian footballer
 (born 1975), Norwegian photographer
Lars Anders Tomter (born 1959), Norwegian viola player
Liv Tomter (1901–1978), Norwegian politician